

Endless Chain Ridge is a 16 kilometre long,  high, mountainous ridge located in Jasper National Park, in the Canadian Rockies of Alberta, Canada. The ridge is situated at the southern end of the Maligne Range, and east of the confluence of the Sunwapta River with the Athabasca River. Seen from the Icefields Parkway, the ridge is relatively unimpressive, but from the east side it appears as a rugged chain of peaks, all quite difficult to climb.

History

The ridge was named in 1907 by Mary Schäffer, the same year that Jasper National Park was established. In her book, "A Hunter of Peace," Mary wrote: "A short distance beyond the rock-slide and on the river's right, begins a low, rocky ridge, which for length and unadulterated ugliness cannot be beaten. We trailed it for a day and a half and then named it The Endless Chain, well named too, for on reaching the Athabasca shores, we found that it still stretched on in an unbroken line for miles down the river."

The toponym was officially adopted in 1947 by the Geographical Names Board of Canada.

Climate
Based on the Köppen climate classification, Endless Chain Ridge is located in a subarctic climate with cold, snowy winters, and mild summers. Winter temperatures can drop below −20 °C with wind chill factors below −30 °C. Precipitation runoff from Endless Chain Ridge drains west to the Sunwapta River, or east into the Maligne River, both of which are tributaries of the Athabasca River.

Geology
The ridge is composed of sedimentary rock laid down during the Precambrian to Jurassic periods and pushed east and over the top of younger rock during the Laramide orogeny.

Gallery

See also
Geography of Alberta

References

External links
 Parks Canada web site: Jasper National Park
 Weather forecast: Endless Chain Ridge

Two-thousanders of Alberta
Mountains of Jasper National Park
Canadian Rockies